Patriarch Alexander III Tahhan (1869–1958) was Greek Orthodox Patriarch of Antioch and all the East from 1928 to 1958. Patr. Alexander was instrumental in the revival of churches and monasteries within the patriarchate. He also moved for the revival of the Patriarchal Theological School at Balamand.

Patr. Alexander, after consultations with the hierarchs of the other autocephalous churches, on May 31, 1958, authorized Metropolitan Antony Bashir to establish the Western Rite in the Antiochian Archdiocese in the United States.

Patr. Alexander died on 17 June 1958.

Literature

References

External links
 Primates of the Apostolic See of Antioch

1869 births
1958 deaths
Greek Orthodox Patriarchs of Antioch
Syrian Christians
Place of birth missing
People from Damascus
20th-century Eastern Orthodox archbishops
20th-century Syrian people
19th-century Syrian people